The 2022–23 LBA season is the 101st season of the Lega Basket Serie A (LBA), the men's top tier professional basketball division of the Italian basketball league system.

Teams

Promotion and relegation 
Fortitudo Bologna and Vanoli Cremona ended, respectively, on 15th and 16th place and therefore relegated to the Serie A2.

Scafati and Verona were two best teams in Serie A2 and therefore promoted to Serie A.

Number of teams by region

Venues and locations

Managerial changes

Referees

Regular season 
In the regular season, teams play against each other home-and-away in a round-robin format. The matchdays are from 2 October 2022, to May 2023.

Playoffs 

The LBA playoffs quarterfinals and semifinals are best of five formats, while the finals series are best of seven format. The playoffs will start in May 2023, to finish in June 2023, depending on result.

Serie A clubs in European competitions 

In the 2022–23 season, Olimpia Milano and Virtus Bologna participate in the EuroLeague. Brescia, Trento and Venezia participate in the EuroCup. Reggio Emilia and Sassari participate in the Champions League. Brindisi participates in the Europe Cup.

See also 

 2022 Italian Basketball Supercup

References

External links 
 Lega Basket website 

Lega Basket Serie A seasons
Italian
2022–23 in Italian basketball
Italy